In With the Old is Pepper's third album, released on March 30, 2004 (see 2004 in music).

Track listing
 "Back Home" – 3:12
 "Are You Down?" – 3:55
 "Love Affair" – 3:23
 "Use Me" – 4:07
 "Seven Weeks" – 3:43
 "Ashes" – 3:01
 "Border Town" – 3:39
 "Wanna Know You" – 2:57
 "Keep Your Head Bangin" – 3:03
 "Your 45" – 3:36
 "Punk Rock Cowboy" – 3:25
 "Look What I Found" – 3:31

Personnel
Zach Barnhorst - Guitar, Engineer, Mixing, Vocal Engineer, Vocal Producer
Bret Bollinger - Bass, Vocals, Group Member
Joe Gastwirt - Mastering
Ryan Immegart - Photography, Layout Design, A&R
Ronnie King - Keyboards
Michael Nobrega - A&R
Ron St. Germain - Producer
Pepper - Arranger
Kaleo Wassman - Guitar, Vocals, Group Member
Yesod Williams - Percussion, Drums, Group Member
Richard Woolcott - Executive Producer

Charts
Album - Billboard (North America)

References

2004 albums
Pepper (band) albums
Volcom Entertainment albums